Anna-Lena Blomkvist (born 1973) is a Swedish politician. She was elected as Member of the Riksdag in September 2022 and represents the constituency of Dalarna County. She is affiliated with the Sweden Democrats.

Blomkvist is also the political secretary and spokeswoman for the Sweden Democrats in Dalarna and is a municipal councilor and group leader on the council for the party in Leksand.

References 

Living people
1973 births
Place of birth missing (living people)
21st-century Swedish politicians
21st-century Swedish women politicians
Members of the Riksdag 2022–2026
Members of the Riksdag from the Sweden Democrats
Women members of the Riksdag